Massey University is a university based in Palmerston North, New Zealand, with significant campuses in Albany and Wellington. Massey University has approximately 30,883 students, 13,796 of whom are extramural or distance-learning students, making it New Zealand's second largest university when not counting international students. Research is undertaken on all three campuses, and more than 3,000 international students from over 100 countries study at the university.

Massey University is the only university in New Zealand offering degrees in aviation, dispute resolution, veterinary medicine, and nanoscience. Massey's veterinary school is accredited by the American Veterinary Medical Association and is recognised in the United States, Australia, Canada, and Britain. Massey's agriculture programme is the highest-ranked in New Zealand, and 19th in Quacquarelli Symonds' (QS) world university subject rankings. Massey's Bachelor of Aviation (Air Transport Pilot) is an internationally recognised and accredited qualification, is the first non-engineering degree to be recognised by the Royal Aeronautical Society (1998), and has ISO9001-2000 accreditation.

History
The New Zealand Agricultural College Act of 1926 laid the foundation for the sixth college of the University of New Zealand (UNZ). It allowed for the amalgamation of the agricultural schools of Victoria University College in Wellington and Auckland University College to establish the New Zealand Agricultural College.

In 1927 the Massey Agricultural College Act was passed, renaming the college Massey Agricultural College after former New Zealand Prime Minister William Fergusson Massey, who died in 1925 and had been vigorous in land reform efforts. The Massey Agricultural College Council first met on 1 February 1927, and the Batchelar property, near the present Turitea site, was purchased that June. The college was officially opened for tuition on 20 March 1928 by O. J. Hawkin. The first woman to enrol was Enid Hills, who enrolled in 1932.

With the demise of the UNZ in 1961, it became Massey College, and associated closer with Victoria University of Wellington (VUW) until full autonomy could be gained. In 1960 a branch of VUW, the Palmerston North University College (PNUC), was established in Palmerston North to teach humanities and social studies subjects as well as provide distance education, known then as extramural study. On 1 January 1963 PNUC amalgamated with Massey College to form Massey University College of Manawatu. The Massey University Act 1963 granted Massey full autonomy and university status with degree conferring powers from 1 January 1964, as well as a new name, Massey University of Manawatu. Its present name was adopted in 1966.

Inaugurated with a tree planting ceremony in 1993, classes began at Massey's Albany campus that same year.

In December 2010 Massey announced that the Wellington campus would close its School of Engineering and Advanced Technology the next month. Students were offered places at either the Albany or Manawatū campuses with compensation, but those who could not make the move and chose to undertake their degree elsewhere were given no compensation, and only a few papers were able to be cross-credited.

The College of Health was launched in February 2013  with three broad goals: promoting health and wellbeing, disease and injury prevention and protecting people and communities from environmental risks to health.

In December 2016, the Chancellor of the university, Chris Kelly, caused outrage by making several comments in a rural newspaper regarding the gender of those in the veterinarian profession. While outlining changes that were being made to the structure of the university's veterinarian and agricultural degrees, Kelly said that more women passed the first year of the veterinarian degree "because women mature earlier than men, work hard and pass. Whereas men find out about booze and all sorts of crazy things during their first year...  That’s fine, but the problem is one woman graduate is equivalent to two-fifths of a full-time equivalent vet throughout her life because she gets married and has a family, which is normal." These remarks caused widespread outrage, with Kelly's apology via Twitter and Facebook doing little to calm the situation. Kelly resigned as Chancellor on 14 December 2016, and was replaced promptly by then Pro Chancellor Michael Ahie.

In August 2018 Don Brash, a former Leader of the Opposition, was due to speak at the university following an invitation of the Massey University Politics Society. Citing security concerns, Jan Thomas, the Vice Chancellor of Massey University, canceled the booking the student society had made to use university facilities. Thomas was widely criticised and calls were made for her resignation. The Prime Minister of New Zealand Jacinda Ardern described canceling the event as an overreaction. A review by Massey University's Council subsequently cleared Thomas of wrongdoing, with Chancellor Michael Ahie stating that the Council supported and had full confidence in Professor Thomas. Massey University's Māori staff association Te Matawhānui publicly spoke out in support of Thomas, particularly due to her leadership of Massey as a te Tiriti-led university.

Campuses

Massey University has campuses in the Manawatū at Palmerston North, at Wellington (in the suburb of Mt Cook) and on Auckland's North Shore at Albany. In addition, Massey offers most of its degrees extramurally within New Zealand and internationally. It has the nation's largest business college. Research is undertaken on all three campuses.

New Zealand's first satellite, KiwiSAT is currently being designed and built by New Zealand Radio Amateurs with the support of Massey, especially in space environment testing.

Manawatū Campus

Massey University was first established at the Turitea campus in Palmerston North, and hosts around 9,000 students annually.

The Turitea site houses the main administrative units of Massey University as well as the College of Humanities and Social Sciences, the College of Sciences, and the Massey Business School. It is also home to the only Veterinary School in New Zealand. Massey University acquired a smaller second campus in Palmerston North in Hokowhitu when it merged with the Palmerston North College of Education in 1996, which was combined with the existing Faculty of Education to form Massey University's College of Education. In 2013 the Institute of Education was formed as part of the College of Humanities and Social Sciences. The Hokowhitu Campus was later sold in 2016 after the institute was relocated to the Turitea campus.

Wharerata is a historic colonial home built in 1901 and surrounded by formal gardens and mature trees. It housed the staff social club until the late 1990s, and is now used as a cafe, function centre and wedding venue.

In February 2023 the University announced that it would be building two solar farms on the Palmerston North campus, with a peak output of 7.87MW.

Auckland Campus

Since 1993 the Auckland campus in Albany has grown rapidly in a fast developing part of Auckland's North Shore City. Science and Business are the two largest colleges on the campus with the College of Science housing the New Zealand Institute for Advanced Study solely on the campus. Around 7,000 students are enrolled at Albany. This campus has grown since then and an on-campus accommodation facility opened in semester one 2015. On the Albany campus, a large golden chicken wing sculpture commemorates the site's history as a chicken farm.

Wellington Campus
The Wellington campus was created through the merger with Wellington Polytechnic that was approved by the New Zealand Government and took place in 1999. The history of Wellington Polytechnic goes back to 1886 when the Wellington School of Design was established, it had a name change in 1891 to Wellington Technical School and in 1963 it was divided into Wellington Polytechnic and Wellington High School.

Part of Massey Wellington sits inside the Dominion Museum building. The Wellington campus primarily specialises in Design (College of Creative Arts), Nursing, and Communication and Journalism. It has over 4,000 students.

Extramural
Extramural study first began in 1960 and Massey University is New Zealand's largest and pre-eminent provider of distance education. Massey is known for its flexible learning and innovative delivery options and this tradition continues in the use of blended and online learning.

The university, in the mid-2010s, embarked on a major project to further digitise its distance delivery and in 2015 adopted Moodle (branded as Stream) as its new Learning Management System (LMS).

The Covid-19 pandemic that started in 2019 further spurred investment in digital distance education.

Governance

The governing body of Massey Agricultural College, and Massey College, was the Council (known as the Board of Governors, between 1938 and 1952). Massey University is governed by the University Council. The council oversees the management and control of the institution's affairs, concerns and property.

The following table lists those who have held the position of Chair of the Board of Governors of the college and later Chancellor of the university, being the ceremonial head of the institution.

The following table lists those who have held the position of principal of the college and later vice-chancellor of the university, being the chief executive officer of the institution.

Academic profile

Key facts
From 2008 Annual Report:

 $374 million operating revenue
 $57 million external research and contract funding
 3127 staff (full-time Equivalent)
 33,905 students (19,432 EFTS)
 27251 undergraduate students (15,070 EFTS)
 7212 postgraduate students (3,428 EFTS)
 1046 doctorate students (934 EFTS)
 112 doctoral completions
 3384 Māori students
 895 Pasifika students
 2447 students with disabilities
 2 National Centres of Research Excellence (and numerous University-based Research Centres)
 Hosts the National Centre for Tertiary Teaching Excellence
 The university has almost 100 formal academic arrangements with overseas institutions
 Massey is the 10th largest user of Information and Communications Technology (ICT) in New Zealand

Academic rankings

Student life

Massey University Students' Association

The Massey University Students' Association Federation (MUSAF) represents the student bodies at Massey University. It includes the Albany Students' Association (ASA), Massey [Manawatu] Students Association (MUSA), Massey at Wellington Students' Association (MAWSA), Manawatahi,  Te Waka o Ngā Ākonga Māori, and the Massey Extramural Students' Society (EXMSS). Each individual students' association organises activities and support for its members, sometimes organising student events, publicising student issues, administering student facilities and assisting affiliated student clubs and societies.

The Albany Students' Association, incorporated in 1998, represents students at Albany campus. It is the only student association in Auckland with full membership of the New Zealand Union of Students' Associations. The ASA operates Evolution Bar and runs annual events like the first semester Orientation festival, second semester Winterfest, Woman's fest, Political Awareness Day and Boys Will Be Boys event. It previously published the fortnightly Satellite Magazine, which was awarded second for best small publication in the 2006 ASPA awards. In 2012 the magazine was replaced with a cross-campus magazine called Massive.

MAWSA was originally known as WePSA (Wellington Polytechnic Students' Association) and was incorporated in 1975. It became MAWSA and a member of MUSAF when Massey University established its Wellington Campus. MAWSA publishes Massive Magazine, the national student magazine for all Massey University Campuses.

Radio Control
The Palmerston North arm of the student association operates Radio Control, a student radio station based on the Turitea campus. It broadcasts on 99.4 FM, transmitting from an aerial on campus, and streams online. The station was founded in 1981 as 'Masskeradio' and has also been known as 'Radio Massey'. Radio Control's long-time station mascot Gordon the Dinosaur stood to become the Palmerston North MP, promising to build a moving walkway from the city centre to the university campus.

The station is run by paid staff and volunteers, with general interest shows between 07:00 and 19:00, and specialist local music and genre-based shows at night. Radio Control is funded by NZ on Air and the university and regularly hosts live events and broadcasts from various events both on and off the Massey University campus. It has also provided an early platform for New Zealand artists like Benny Tipene, Avalanche City and Evermore.

People

Faculty and staff

Notable faculty, past or present, include:

Fiona Alpass
Marti Anderson (statistician)
Kingsley Baird
Helen Moewaka Barnes
Rosemary E. Bradshaw
Dianne Brunton
Barbara Burlingame
Paul Callaghan
Marta Camps
Brian Carpenter
Kerry Chamberlain
Ashraf Choudhary
Shane Cotton
Anne de Bruin
John Dunmore
Mary Earle
Craig Harrison
Joel Hayward
Darrin Hodgetts
Jill Hooks
Ingrid Horrocks
Joanne Hort
Mike Joy
Vicki Karaminas
Hugh Kawharu
Sarah Leberman
Steve Maharey
Gaven Martin
Stuart McCutcheon
Robert McLachlan
Jane Mills
Caroline Miller
Mary Morgan-Richards
Anne Noble
David Officer
W. H. Oliver
Farah Palmer
David Parry
Diane Pearson
David Penny
Geoffrey Peren
Peter Schwerdtfeger
Nicolette Sheridan
Lockwood Smith
David Stenhouse
Christine Stephens
Marilyn Waring
John Stuart Yeates

Notable alumni

Politicians

Paula Bennett (BA, social policy)
Ashraf Choudhary (PhD, agronomy)
Brian Connell (history and geography)
Wyatt Creech (agriculture)
Peter Dunne (business administration)
Nathan Guy (agriculture)
Pete Hodgson (BVSc, veterinary science)
Steven Joyce (BSc, zoology)
John Luxton (BAgSci and Dip. Ag Science)
Steve Maharey (MA, sociology)
Tony Ryall (BBS and Dip. Business Studies)
Nicky Wagner (MBA)
Ian Shearer
Sir Lockwood Smith (BAgSci and MAgSci)

Sportspeople

Jo Aleh (born 1986) – world champion and Olympic champion sailor
Nathan Cohen (born 1986) – world champion and Olympic champion rower
Rico Gear – rugby union
Scott Talbot – swimmer and swimming coach
Farah Palmer (Black Ferns)
Graham Henry (All Blacks)
Paul Hitchcock (Black Caps)
Nehe Milner-Skudder (All Blacks)
Gemma Flynn (Black Sticks)
Sally Johnston – sport shooter

Others

Fiona Alpass —  full professor at the Massey University.
Kay Cohen (born 1952) – fashion designer
Catherine Day – biochemist (BSc and PhD)
Robert Holmes à Court (1937–1990) – businessman (BAgSci, forestry)
Susan Kemp – social work academic
Alan Kirton  (1933–2001) – agricultural scientist (BAgrSc and MAgSc)
Phil Lamason –  WWII RNZAF pilot
Kyle Lockwood – architectural designer, designer of the Silver fern flag (DipDArch and DipArchTech)
Ross McEwan – banker, CEO of National Australia Bank
Claire McLachlan – professor, specialist in early-childhood literacy
Simon Moutter – engineer, businessman (BSc, physics)
Craig Norgate – businessman
Sir Alan Stewart (1917–2004) – founding vice-chancellor of Massey
Richard Taylor – special effects technician
Stephen Tindall – businessman
Saffronn Te Ratana – artist
Lucy Easthope - researcher

Coat of arms

See also
List of honorary doctors of Massey University

Notes

References
 History section of Massey University calendar
 Pictures from the past, in Massey News
OWENS, J.M.R. Campus Beyond the Walls: The First 25 Years of Massey University's Extramural Programme
Palmerston North, Dunmore Press Ltd., 1985. Available free from Massey at

External links

Massey University's website

 

 
Palmerston North
Educational institutions established in 1927
Veterinary schools
Universities in New Zealand
1927 establishments in New Zealand
Veterinary medicine in New Zealand